Conservation in Iceland is regulated under a programme known in Icelandic as Náttúruverndarlög (conservation of nature) initiated in 1971. It offers a basis for ensuring the long-term protection of places or areas.
The Umhverfisstofnun (environmental authority) decides which areas are to be addressed.

There are six main types of conservation in Iceland:
 Fólkvangar (country parks)
 Friðlönd (nature reserves)
 Náttúruvætti (natural monuments)
 Tegundir og búsvæði (species and habitats)
 Þjóðgarðar (natural parks)
 Önnur svæði (other)

See also 
 Conservation biology
 Dettifoss
 Heidmork

References